

154001–154100 

|-id=004
| 154004 Haolei ||  || Lei Hao (born 1976), Chinese astronomer with the Sloan Digital Sky Survey || 
|-id=005
| 154005 Hughharris ||  || Hugh Harris (born 1947), American astronomer with the Sloan Digital Sky Survey with stellar parallax measurements and white dwarf identifications || 
|-id=006
| 154006 Suzannehawley ||  || Suzanne Hawley (born 1960), American astronomer with the Sloan Digital Sky Survey || 
|}

154101–154200 

|-id=141
| 154141 Kertész ||  || André Kertész (1894–1985), Hungarian photographer || 
|}

154201–154300 

|-bgcolor=#f2f2f2
| colspan=4 align=center | 
|}

154301–154400 

|-id=378
| 154378 Hennessy ||  || Gregory Hennessy (born 1963), American astronomer with the Sloan Digital Sky Survey || 
|}

154401–154500 

|-id=493
| 154493 Portisch ||  || Lajos Portisch (born 1937), a Hungarian chess Grandmaster || 
|}

154501–154600 

|-id=554
| 154554 Heatherelliott ||  || Heather A. Elliott (born 1971) is a principal scientist at the Southwest Research Institute who served as a co-investigator for plasma and solar wind science for the New Horizons mission to Pluto. || 
|-id=587
| 154587 Ennico ||  || Kimberly Ennico Smith (born 1972), a Research Astrophysicist at NASA Ames Research Center, served as a Deputy Project Scientist for the New Horizons Mission to Pluto. || 
|}

154601–154700 

|-id=660
| 154660 Kavelaars ||  || John J. Kavelaars (born 1966), Canadian astronomer and discoverer of minor planets || 
|}

154701–154800 

|-id=714
| 154714 de Schepper ||  || Mieke de Schepper (1943–2003) was diagnosed with breast cancer in 1987 and died fighting against the disease || 
|}

154801–154900 

|-id=865
| 154865 Stefanheutz ||  || Stefan Heutz (born 1980), German jurist and amateur astrophotographer || 
|}

154901–155000 

|-id=902
| 154902 Davidtoth ||  || David Toth (born 1955), Canadian Emergency Room physician, private pilot and radio operator || 
|-id=932
| 154932 Sviderskiene ||  || Zinaida Sviderskiene (born 1945), Lithuanian astronomer and director of the Vilnius Planetarium || 
|-id=938
| 154938 Besserman ||  || Lawrence Besserman (born 1945),  specialist in medieval and early modern periods of English Literature at the Hebrew University of Jerusalem || 
|-id=991
| 154991 Vinciguerra ||  || Lucia Vinciguerra (born 1965), friend of Italian astronomer Andrea Boattini who co-discovered this minor planet || 
|}

References 

154001-155000